Unikowice  is a village in the administrative district of Gmina Paczków, within Nysa County, Opole Voivodeship, in south-western Poland, close to the Czech border.

Typical for the region, the German name of the village derives from the name of the Lokator who brought German farmers to the village which was a typical Waldhufendorf.

The village has a population of 360.

References

Unikowice